Hamilton Springs station is a train station in Lebanon, Tennessee, serving Nashville's regional rail line, the Music City Star. It is a transit-oriented development (TOD) infill station and was completed in 2018 with service beginning on August 27 of that year.

References

External links

Buildings and structures in Wilson County, Tennessee
Music City Star stations
Railway stations in the United States opened in 2018